The following bibliography includes notable sources concerning the Eureka Rebellion. This article is currently being expanded and revised.

Bibliography

Historiography

General histories

 
 
 
 Clark, Manning, A Short History of Australia (MacMillan, Melbourne, reprinted illustrated 2nd edition, 1982).
 
 Ward, Russel, Australia: A short history (Ure Smith, Sydney, 1979).

Surveys of the period

 
 
 Goodman, David, Gold Seeking: Victoria and California in the 1850’s, Allen & Unwin, 1994.
 Keesing, Nancy, History of the Australian Goldrushes, Lloyd O’Neil Pty. Ltd. 1971.
 
 
 
 Bert and Bon Strange, Eureka: Gold Graft and Grievances, B&B Strange, Ballarat, 1973.
 Sunter, Anne Beggs and Livingston, Kevin (eds) The Legacy of Eureka; Past, Present and Future. Ballarat, Australian Studies Centre, University of Ballarat, 1998.
 Wickham, Dorothy, Eureka, BHS Publishing, 2014.

Local histories

 
 Stacpoole, H.J., Gold at Ballarat: The Ballarat East Goldfield Its Discovery and Development, Lowden Publishing Co., 1971.
 Strange, W, Ballarat, A Brief History, Lowden Publishing Co., 1971.

Popular histories

Pictorial histories

Narrative histories

Military histories

Social histories

 Connelly, C.N., Miners' Rights, Who Are Our Enemies?: Racism and the Working Class in Australia, (Hale and Ironmonger, Neutral Bay, 1978).
 
 
 Potts, E. Daniel & Potts Annette, 'American Republicanism and Disturbances on the Victorian Goldfields' (1968) Vol. 13, No. 50: pp. 145-164 Historical Studies.

Political histories

 
 
 
 
 Walshe, R. D., The Eureka Stockade, 1854-1954 (Current Book Distributors, Sydney, 1954).

Feminist histories

 Wickham, Dorothy, Eureka's Women, BHS Publishing, 2014.
 Wickham, Dorothy, Women of the Diggings: Ballarat 1854, BHS Publishing, 2009.

Other specialised studies

 
 Gervasoni, Clare, Outbreak at Ballarat, BHS Publishing, 1998.
 Gervasoni & Wickham, Among the Diggers, BHS Publishing, 1999.
 
 Gervasoni, Clare, Outbreak at Ballarat: Eureka from the Mount Alexander Mail".
 Sidney, Samuel, The Three Colonies of Australia, NSW, Victoria, South Australia, Their Pastures, Copper Mines and Gold Fields, Ingram. Cooke & Co, London, 1852.
 Stanley, Peter, The Remote Garrison, The British Army in Australia, Kangaroo Press, 1986.
 
 
 Wickham, Dorothy, Shot in the Dark, BHS Publishing, 1998.
 Wickham, Dorothy, St Alipus: Ballarat’s First Church, self-published, 1997.

Commemorative publications

 Rich, Margaret (ed), Eureka: The event and its continuing impact on the nation (Ballarat Fine Art Gallery, Ballarat, 1994).

Biography

 
 O'Grady, Desmond, Raffaello! Raffaello!: A Biography of Raffaello Carboni (Hale and Iremonger, Sydney, 1985).
 O'Grady, Desmond, Stages of Revolution: A biography of the Eureka Stockade's Raffaello Carboni (Hardie Grant Books, Prahan, 2004). 
 
 
 

Battlefield archaeology

 
 

Vexiollology

 
 
 
 
 
 
 
 
 

Primary sources

Memoirs

 
 
 
 Huyghue, Samuel Douglas Smyth The Ballarat Riots, 1854 held at the Mitchell Library, Sydney.
 
 Nicholls, H.R (May 1890). Reminiscences of the Eureka Stockade. The Centennial Magazine: An Australian Monthly. II: August 1889 to July 1890 (available in an annual compilation).
 R.E. Johns Papers, MS10075, Manuscript Collection, La Trobe Library, State Library of Victoria.
 
 
 

Diaries

 Evans, Charles, diary, 24 September 1853-21 January 1855, SLV, MS 11484, Box 1777/4.
 Pierson, Thomas, diary, SLV, MS 11646, Box 2178/4-5.
 Taylor, Theophilus, diary, 23 September 1853-1 August 1856, Ballarat Genealogy Society.

Letters

 Pasley, Charles: 1855, Letter to his father. FM 3/359 B1564 6-46A, Mitchell Library, State Library of New South Wales.
 Smyth, Patrick: 13 December 1854, Ballarat. Letter to William Henry Archer, Melbourne Diocesan Historical Commission.
 Wilson, John: 1856, Letter from Mt. Egerton. ML DOC 2771 6-660c, Mitchell Library, State Library of New South Wales.

Affidavits

 

Official reports

 
 
 
 

Other contemporaneous reports

The Argus

 The Argus, 19 August 1853, 4.
 
 
 
 
 
 
 
 
 

The Age

 
 

The Geelong Advertiser and Intelligencer

 Geelong Advertiser, 2 December 1854, 4.
 

The Sydney Morning Herald

 

The Kyogle Examiner

 

Daily Mercury

 

Legislation

 An Act for the Better Government of Her Majesty's Australian Colonies 1850 (UK).
 The Victoria Electoral Act of 1851 No 3a (NSW).
 An Act to extend the Elective Franchise 1854 (Vic).
 An Act for granting duties of Customs upon Gold exported from Victoria 1855 (Vic).
 An Act to make provision for certain Immigrants 1855 (Vic).
 Victoria Constitution Act 1855 (UK).
 Legislative Council Reform Act 1950 (Vic).

Proclamations

 Supplement to the Victorian Government Gazette, No 6, 13 August 1851, 209.
 Victorian Government Gazette, No. 8, 27 August 1851, 307.
 Victorian Government Gazette, No 22, 3 December 1851, 825.
 Victorian Government Gazette, No 25, 24 December 1851, 871.

Cases

 
 

Other documents

 Ballarat Reform League Charter, 11 November 1854, VPRS 4066/P Unit 1, November no. 69, VA 466 Governor (including Lieutenant Governor 1851–1855 and Governor's Office), Public Record Office Victoria.

Reference Books

 
 
 
 
 The International Encyclopedia of Revolution and Protest, London, Blackwell Publishing, 2009.

Journals

 
 
 

Historical magazines

 
 

Other media reports

 John Bailey, 'Flagging the truth,' The Sunday Age, 8 January 2012, Extra, p. 13.
 Jo Roberts, 'The art of the uprising,' The Age, 29 November 2004, A3, p. 7.
 John Huxley, 'Birth of a notion,' Sydney Morning Herald Weekend Edition, 27-28 November 2004, p. 34. 
 James Button, 'Children of rebellion maintain the rage,' The Age, 27 November 2004, pp. 1, 10.

Book reviews

 'Book pushes Eureka as new Independence Day,' The Courier, 15 July 2004.
 Raise the Standard, Sydney Morning Herald, 5 January 2013 <http://www.smh.com.au/entertainment/books/raise-the-standard-20130104-2c8fn.html>.

Eureka commemorations

 Best, Catherine, 'Flag should move to Eureka Centre,' The Courier, 13 May 2004 <http://www.thecourier.com.au/story/578530/flag-should-move-to-eureka-centre-report>.
 
 'Eureka Day in Jeopardy,' The Courier, 31 August 2004, p. 1-2.
 
 'Latham says he'll fly Eureka flag at parliament,' The Courier, 15 July 2004.
 Murphy, Matthew, 'Time’s up at last for railway landmark,' The Age;;, 14 December 2005, p. 13.
 'New structure proposed for Eureka Centre,' The Courier, 9 May 2011 <http://www.thecourier.com.au/story/556730/new-structure-proposed-for-eureka-centre>
 'Revamp upgrades Eureka story,' The Courier, 4 June 2003 <http://www.thecourier.com.au/story/331240/revamp-upgrades-eureka-story?>

Opinion pieces

 Cassin, Ray 'Eureka flag: appropriated or not, it's appropriate,' The Sunday Age, 16 December 2001.
 MacGregor Duncan, Andrew Leigh, Peter Tynan, 'Time to reclaim this legend as our driving force,' Sydney Morning Herald, 29 November 2004, p. 15 <http://www.smh.com.au/news/Opinion/Time-to-reclaim-this-legend-as-our-driving-force/2004/11/28/1101577352049.html>.
 
 Henderson, Gerard 'Libs should battle for Eureka,' Sydney Morning Herald, 30 November 2004, p. 13.
 Murray, Robert, 'The unromantic truth about the Eureka Stockade,' The Age, 26 December 2003, p. 13.
 Ramsay, Alan, 'Room for all in the stockade, bar one,' 18 December 2004, Sydney Morning Herald, p. 33.
 Sheridan, Greg, 'Army salutes tank order,' The Australian, 17 February 2005, p. 15.

Society and culture

 Australian Broadcasting Corporation, 'Anderson flags Eureka debate,' ABC news, 10 September 2004 (John Anderson).
 David Ellery, 'Sword of Gallipoli: the mystery and the myth,' Canberra Times, 24 April 2013 <http://www.canberratimes.com.au/act-news/sword-of-gallipoli-the-mystery-and-the-myth-20130424-2if8x.html>.

Newsletters

 Benwell, Phillip, 'Eureka. Be not misled! The Eureka Stockade has nothing to do with a republic or the Labor Party but everything to do with the Ultimate Supremacy of Law and Justice Under the Crown' (2004), Australian Monarchist League.

Seminars

Interviews

Speeches

Compilations

 
 
 Mayne, Alan (ed), Eureka: reappraising an Australian Legend (Network Books, Perth, 2007).

Bibliographies by subject
Eureka Rebellion